, also known as , is a religion founded in 1892 by Deguchi Nao (1836–1918), often categorised as a new Japanese religion originated from Shinto. The spiritual leaders of the movement have always been women within the Deguchi family; however, Deguchi Onisaburō (1871–1948) has been considered an important figure in Omoto as a seishi (spiritual teacher). Since 2001, the movement has been guided by its fifth leader, Kurenai Deguchi.

History
Deguchi Nao, a housewife from the tiny town of Ayabe, Kyoto Prefecture, declared that she had a "spirit dream" at the Japanese New Year in 1892, becoming possessed (kamigakari) by Ushitora no Konjin and starting to transmit his words. According to the official Oomoto biography of Deguchi, she came from a family which had long been in poverty, and had pawned nearly all of her possessions to feed her children and invalid husband. Deguchi was certainly not an otherwise famous figure, and independent accounts of her do not exist. After 1895, and with a growing number of followers, she became a teacher of the Konkōkyō religion. In 1898 she met Ueda Kisaburō who had previous studies in kamigakari (spirit possession), and in 1899 they established the Kinmeikai, which became the Kinmei Reigakkai later in the same year. In 1900 Kisaburō married Nao’s fifth daughter Sumi and adopted the name Deguchi Onisaburō. Omoto was thus established based on Nao's automatic writings (Ofudesaki) and Onisaburō’s spiritual techniques.

Since 1908 the group has taken diverse names — Dai Nihon Shūseikai, Taihonkyō (1913) and Kōdō Ōmoto (1916). Later the movement changed from Kōdō Ōmoto ("great origin of the imperial way") to just Ōmoto ("great origin") and formed the Shōwa Seinenkai in 1929 and the Shōwa Shinseikai in 1934.

By 1920 the group had their own newspaper, the Taishō nichinichi shinbun, and started to expand overseas. A great amount of its popularity derived from a method of inducing spirit possession called chinkon kishin, which was most widely practiced from 1919 to 1921. Following a police crackdown, Onisaburō banned chinkon kishin in 1923.

Alarmed by the popularity of Ōmoto, the Imperial Japanese Government, which promoted kokutai and the Imperial Way, condemned the sect for worshipping Ookunitokotachi above Amaterasu, the Sun Goddess from whom the Emperor of Japan claimed descent. In 1921, the first Ōmoto Incident (Ōmoto jiken) resulted in the Ōmoto headquarters being destroyed, as well as Onisaburo and two adherents being jailed. In 1924, retired naval captain Yutaro Yano and his associates within the Black Dragon Society invited Onisaburo on a journey to Mongolia. Onisaburo led a group of Ōmoto disciples, including Aikido founder Morihei Ueshiba. They were captured by the forces of Chinese warlord Zhang Zuolin, but were released upon realizing they were Japanese nationals. After he returned to Japan, he organized religious allies like Jinruiaizenkai to promote a universal brotherhood and world peace. Foreign religions from Korea, China, Russia, Germany and Bulgaria, including the Red Swastika Society, joined this movement. This was followed in 1935 by the second Ōmoto Incident, which again left its headquarters in ruins and its leaders in jail; Ōmoto was effectively outlawed until the end of World War II. With the second Ōmoto Incident, Oomoto became the first religious organization who was prosecuted under the Public Security Preservation Law of 1925.

After the war, the organization reappeared as Aizen'en, a movement dedicated to achieve world peace, and with that purpose it was registered in 1946 under the Religious Corporations Ordinance.

In 1949 Ōmoto joined the World Federalist Movement and the world peace campaign. In 1952 the group returned to its older name, becoming the religious corporation Ōmoto under the Religious Corporations Law. At present time, the movement has its headquarters at Kyoto Prefecture and has a nominal membership of approximately 170,000. There is a temple for religious services in Ayabe, and a mission in a large park on the former site of Kameoka Castle that includes offices, schools, a publishing house, and shrines in Kameoka.

International activities
Since the time of Onisaburo Deguchi, the constructed language Esperanto has played a major role in the Oomoto religion. Starting in 1924, the religion has published books and magazines in Esperanto and this continues today. It is said that they introduced Esperanto when they had contact with the Baháʼí Faith in 1921.

Oomoto and their adherents promote the Japanese arts and culture like Noh theater and the tea ceremony. Oomoto is engaged in peace campaigns, aid work, and other similar activities.

From 1925 until 1933 Oomoto maintained a mission in Paris. From there, missionaries travelled throughout Europe, spreading the word that Onisaburo Deguchi was a Messiah or Maitreya, who would unify the world.

Doctrine
Omotokyo was strongly influenced by Konkokyo, Ko-Shintō (ancient Shinto) and folk spiritual and divination traditions; it also integrated Kokugaku (National Studies) teachings and modern ideas on world harmony and peace, creating a new doctrine. It shares with Konkokyo the belief in the benevolence of Konjin, who was previously considered an evil kami, and shares with other ancient Shinto schools the teachings that proclaim the achievement of personal virtue as a step to universal harmony.

The fundamental narrative is that Ushitora no konjin, by whom Deguchi Nao was possessed, is actually Kunitokotachi no mikoto, who made the earth and was the original ruler of the world. Many years after Kunitokotachi no mikoto had made the earth and started to rule the world, other gods who learned to be bad made him retired, drove him away to the Northeast and started to call him the worst god. This is the reason why the world is full of evil, and Deguchi Nao’s prophecy was the beginning of the second rule of Kunitokotachi no mikoto, therefore a change of the world would begin soon. Through her prophecies, Ushitora no konjin warned people to stop selfishness. They even think Setsubun is persecution against Ushitora no Konjin.

Believers think one god creates and fosters all things and lives in the universe. However, Oomoto is partly polytheism and they rather call all righteous gods, including the god who creates everything in the universe, Oomotosumeoomikami as oneness. Oomoto means the great origin, sume means “govern”, and oomikami means god. Any god but one god appears in order to realize the aim of god, therefore in Oomoto every god or thing is just another appearance of one god after all. At the same time god is energy, which is the principle of the universe, and the universal spirit everything has. And believers think Ame-no-Minakanushi, god of the Abrahamic religions and others are different names of the god of creation. However, “Tales of the Spirit World” says the universe begins with the sudden advent of “ヽ” , which is called “Hochi”. He develops into “◉”, which is called “su”, is kotodama of su and is the great origin of god.

In Oomoto, humans are given a special role in the Universe. As the most spiritual beings in the Universe, humans are the masters of the Universe and the agents of god, and if a spirit of a human reaches god and they are united, infinity power will be generated according to the will of god.

The fundamental ways to reach god are the following:
Body of god should be known through observation of the truth of the universe.
Force of god should be known through the preciseness of motions of everything.
Spirit of god should be known through recognition of souls of lives.

Members of Oomoto believe in several kami. The most important are Ookunitokotachi, Ushitora no Konjin and Hitsujisaru. Oomoto members also tend to recognize notable religious figures from other religions, or even notable non-religious figures, as kami – for example, the creator of Esperanto, L. L. Zamenhof is revered as a god. However, all of these kami are believed to be aspects of a single God concept.

The Oomoto affirmation of Zamenhof's godhood is stated, in Esperanto, as follows:

Translated into English, the foregoing reads:

...[T]he spirit of Zamenhof even now continues to act as a missionary of the angelic kingdom; therefore, his spirit was deified in the Senrei-sha shrine.

The belief that two kami, Kunitokodachi no Mikoto and Susano-o no Mikoto, were the original founders and rulers of Japan, who were driven away by Amaterasu Ōmikami, the divine ancestor of the imperial line, is what placed this religion in opposition to the government in pre-war Japan. However, Amaterasu-oomikami is also considered to be a righteous god.

Followers of Oomoto believe Haya-susano-o no Mikoto, who had been originally told to rule the earth by Izanagi, was punished for all the Amatsutsumi instead of all gods and is a redeemer of the world, mainly based on the story of Amano-Iwato and his expulsion from Takaamahara. 

Oomoto’s goal is the realization of the world of Miroku, which means heaven in the real world. They express this in many ways, like “from plum blossom to pine”, “purification of the world”, “the opening of Amano-Iwato of the world”, “the world of clear quartz”, and so on.

The founder emphasized the importance of soil and respect for them. This even led to some Onisaburo’s ideas linked to agrarianism.

Their doctrine includes an idea that things that happen in Ayabe would happen in Japan or in the world. The oppression of them, the Ōmoto Incidents and consequent destruction of their facilities and organization are considered to have been omens of WW2 and consequent destruction of Japan.

Known followers
 One of the more well-known followers of Oomoto was Morihei Ueshiba, a Japanese martial artist and the founder of Aikido. It is commonly thought that Ueshiba's increasing attachment to pacifism in later years and belief that Aikido should be an "art of peace" were inspired by his involvement with the sect. Oomoto priests oversee a ceremony in Ueshiba's honor every April 29 at the Aiki Shrine at Iwama.
 Yamantaka Eye – visual artist, DJ and member of avant musical group Boredoms
 Mokichi Okada, founder of the Church of World Messianity (aka Shinji Shumeikai), was a follower of Oomoto prior to founding his own religion.
 Masaharu Taniguchi, founder of the Seicho-no-Ie, was also a follower of Oomoto prior to founding his own religion.
 Alex Kerr, japanologist, worked for the Oomoto Foundation for 20 years from 1977 on.

References

Further reading 
 Nancy K. Stalker, "Prophet Motive:  Deguchi Onisaburo, Oomoto and the Rise of New Religion in Imperial Japan," University Of Hawaii, 2008, 
 Emily Groszos Ooms, Women and Millenarian Protest in Meiji Japan: Deguchi Nao and Omotokyo, Cornell Univ East Asia Program, 1993, 
 The Great Onisaburo Deguchi, by Kyotaro Deguchi, translated by Charles Rowe, 
 Iwao, Hino. The Outline of Oomoto. Kameoka, Japan, 1968.
 Murakami Shigeyoshi. Japanese Religion in the Modern Century. Translated by H. Byron Earhart. Tokyo, 1980. Originally published as Kindai hyakunen no shukyo. 
 Yasumaru Yoshio. Deguchi Nao Tokyo, 1977.
 Bill Roberts, A Portrait of Oomoto: The Way of Art, Spirit and Peace In the 21st Century, Oomoto Foundation and Bill Roberts, International Department, The Oomoto Foundation, 2006. 
 Bill Roberts, Portraits of Oomoto: Images of the people, shrines, rituals, sacred places and arts of the Oomoto Shinto religion over two decades, Oomoto Foundation, 2020,

External links 
 Bankyo Dokon – Seventy Years of Inter-Religious Activity at Oomoto, Oomoto Foundation, 1997
 Nao Deguchi – A Biography of the Foundress of Oomoto, Based on Kaiso-den by Sakae Ôishi, translated by Charles Rowe and Yasuko Matsudaira, Oomoto Foundation, 1982
 Nordenstorm, L. Ômotos mission på esperanto. En japansk ny religion i förändring från kiliastisk Maitreyaförväntan till religionsdialog. (The Ômoto-Mission in Esperanto. A Japanese new religion changing from chiliastic Ma-itreya-awaiting to religious dialogue.) Esperantoförlaget/Eldona Societo Esperanto. Stockholm, 2002. In Swedish with summaries in English and in Esperanto.
 Oomoto (Official site)
 Oomoto (at www.tryte.com.br)

 
Religious organizations established in 1892
Japanese new religions
1892 establishments in Japan
Shinto new religious movements
13 Shinto Sects